The Tree That Owns Itself is a white oak tree that, according to legend, has legal ownership of itself and of all land within  of its base. Also known as the Jackson Oak, the tree is at the corner of South Finley and Dearing Streets in Athens, Georgia, US. The original tree, thought to have started life between the mid-16th and late 18th century, fell in 1942, but a new tree was grown from one of its acorns and planted in the same location. The current tree is sometimes referred to as the Son of the Tree That Owns Itself. Both trees have appeared in numerous national publications, and the site is a local landmark.

Legend
The earliest-known telling of the tree's story comes from "Deeded to Itself", a front-page article in the Athens Weekly Banner on August 12, 1890. The article explains that the tree had been located on the property of Colonel William Henry Jackson. William Jackson was the son of James Jackson (a soldier in the American Revolution as well as a Congressman, US Senator, and Governor of Georgia), and the father of another James Jackson (a Congressman and Chief Justice of the Supreme Court of Georgia). He was the brother of Jabez Young Jackson, also a Congressman. (William Jackson was reportedly a professor at the University of Georgia and is sometimes mentioned with the title of Doctor. The nature of his military service and the source of the title Colonel are unknown.) Jackson supposedly cherished childhood memories of the tree, and, desiring to protect it, deeded to it the ownership of itself and its surrounding land. By various accounts, this transaction took place between 1820 and 1832. According to the newspaper article, the deed read:

It is unclear whether the story of the Tree That Owns Itself began with the Weekly Banner article, or if it had been an element of local folklore prior to that time. The article's author writes that, in 1890, there were few people still living who knew the story.

The story of the Tree That Owns Itself is widely known and is almost always presented as fact. However, only one person—the anonymous author of "Deeded to Itself"—has ever claimed to have seen Jackson's deed to the tree. Most writers acknowledge that the deed is lost or no longer exists—if in fact it ever did exist. Such a deed would have no legal effect. Under common law, the recipient of a piece of property must have the legal capacity to receive it, and the property must be delivered to—and accepted by—the recipient. Both are impossible for a tree to do, as it isn't a legal person.

William H. Jackson did own the property on the opposite side of Dearing Street from the tree. That plot included the present-day 226 Dearing Street, but in the early 19th century it was simply designated Lot #14. The tree, however, is located on a portion of what had been Lot #15. Jackson and his wife Mildred, along with a J. A. Cobb, sold their property to a Dr. Malthus Ward in 1832, the same year cited on a plaque as being the date of the tree's deed. The Clarke County real estate indices contain no indication of when or from whom Jackson originally purchased the property, although much of the land in that area is reported to have belonged to a Major James Meriwether. Even though Jackson may have lived near the tree as an adult, his childhood was actually spent in Jefferson County, not in Athens, making it unlikely that he had experienced idyllic childhood summers playing beneath the tree's branches.

Recent deeds suggest that the tree's square footage remains part of the property at 125 Dearing Street. These documents describe a parcel bounded on the east by Finley Street and on the north by Dearing Street, an area that would seem to encompass the tree.

This does not confirm that the tree owns itself, but suggests, rather, that it is considered to be within the right-of-way along Finley Street. Athens-Clarke County confirms that the tree is in the right-of-way, and is thus "accepted for care" by municipal authorities; according to city-county officials, local government and the owners of the adjacent property jointly serve as "stewards" for the care of the tree, while Athens' Junior Ladies' Garden Club serves as its "primary advocate". Regarding Jackson's deed, one writer noted at the beginning of the 20th century, "However defective this title may be in law, the public recognized it." In that spirit, it is the stated position of the Athens-Clarke County Unified Government that the tree, in spite of the law, does indeed own itself.  It is the policy of the city of Athens to maintain it as a public street tree.

History
The original Tree That Owns Itself is estimated to have started life at some time between the mid-16th and late 18th centuries. The tree was considered by some to be both the biggest tree in Athens and the most famous tree in the United States. The tree predated the transformation of the area into a residential neighborhood beginning in the mid-19th century. The residence adjacent to the tree, known as Dominie House, was built at the corner of Milledge Avenue and Waddell Street in 1883, and was moved to its present location about twenty years later.

By 1906, erosion had become apparent at the base of the tree. George Foster Peabody paid to have new soil, a commemorative tablet, and a chain barricade supported by eight granite posts installed around the tree. Despite these efforts, the tree reportedly suffered heavy damage during an ice storm in 1907. Although attempts were made at preservation, rot had already set in, and the tree was permanently weakened.

The original oak fell on the evening of October 9, 1942, following a long period of decline. Its poor condition had been known for years, and within days of its collapse, a move was underway to replace the fallen tree with a "son" grown from one of its acorns. One account suggests that the tree had actually died several years before its collapse, the victim of root rot. It has been reported elsewhere that the tree fell on December 1, 1942, succumbing not to old age and disease but rather to a violent windstorm that ravaged much of north Georgia that evening, causing widespread damage and killing several people. While it is possible that some portion of the tree had remained standing for several weeks, meeting a dramatic end at the hands of a killer storm, only the earlier date is supported by newspaper accounts. It is not known why the tree was not dated by counting its rings, unless the tree’s core was rotten out (fairly likely given its age and the way its death has often been described) thereby destroying many if not all of its rings before it ever fell.

Son of The Tree That Owns Itself

After the original tree's demise, its small plot sat vacant for four years. Dan Magill, the young son of Athens' Junior Ladies Garden Club member Elizabeth Magill, suggested that his mother's club find a replacement for the tree. Several Athenians had cultivated seedlings from the acorns of the original tree. The operation was directed by Roy Bowden of the College of Agriculture at the University of Georgia, assisted by students in the Department of Horticulture.

The new tree was officially dedicated in a formal ceremony on December 4, 1946. Athens Mayor Robert L. McWhorter presided and Dr. E.L. Hill, the pastor of the First Presbyterian Church, offered a short prayer. Also in attendance were Capt. and Mrs. Watson and representatives of the Garden Club. Club President Patsy Dudley announced that her group would henceforth take responsibility for maintenance of the tree's plot, which had fallen into disrepair during the vacancy. The new tree, trimmed back to a mere  for transplantation, thrived in its new location. This tree is considered, popularly if not legally, to be the full heir of the original tree. As such, it is sometimes referred to as the Son of The Tree That Owns Itself, although it is generally known by the same title as its progenitor.

On December 4, 1996, the Garden Club staged a celebration to mark the fiftieth anniversary of the planting of the new tree. Dan Magill, who as a boy, had inspired the replanting effort, served as master of ceremonies.

The tree sits near the crest of a hill, at the southwest corner of the intersection of Dearing and Finley Streets, in a quiet residential neighborhood near downtown Athens and UGA's North Campus. The portion of Finley Street leading up the hill to the tree is Athens' only remaining cobblestone street. The tree's lot is separated from the larger portion of the adjacent property by a private driveway; its enclosure also juts several feet into Finley Street. Thus the tree may in fact appear to occupy a small but separate tract of land. The appearance of separation is accentuated by the retaining wall and ornamental chain barrier that surround the tree. Although alongside private homes in a residential neighborhood, the Tree That Owns Itself is "open" to the public, and regularly attracts visitors.

Although the story of the Tree That Owns Itself is more legend than history, the tree has become (along with the University Arch and the Double-Barreled Cannon) one of the most recognized and well-loved symbols of Athens. It is routinely featured in travel guides and other visitor information and has even garnered international recognition through such publications as Ripley's Believe It or Not!, where it has been featured on several occasions.

Tablets

The site of the tree contains two stone tablets. The first is heavily weathered and has suffered the loss of one corner, while the second appears to be considerably newer. Both tablets paraphrase the same portion of William H. Jackson's supposed deed to the tree, with slight alterations made to transform the legalistic language into a first-person declaration of affection:

A small brass plaque, about the size of a playing card, is attached to the lower-left corner of the face of the more weathered of the two tablets. It reads:

In addition to the stone tablets, a larger brass plaque is affixed to the concrete retaining wall that surrounds the tree. The plaque reads:

The entire Dearing Street Historic District (of which the tree is a "resident") was added to the National Register in 1975. The District incorporates an area very roughly bounded by Broad, Finley, Waddell, and Church Streets, and was recognized for its architectural significance. The tree was locally designated a historic landmark on February 2, 1988.

Similar trees
There is another tree with almost identical legal rights in Eufaula, Alabama, United States. In a similar story, this oak tree was bestowed legal ownership to itself on April 9, 1936, with the inscription "Only God can make a tree". Similarly, the tree fell in a storm on April 9, 1961, and it was replaced with another tree in its place ten days later.

See also

List of individual trees
Plant rights

Notes

References

Further reading

External links

"I Am So Great" by Cecily Iddings, a poem referencing the Tree That Owns Itself

1940s individual tree deaths
Tourist attractions in Athens, Georgia
Individual oak trees
Individual trees in Georgia (U.S. state)
National Register of Historic Places in Clarke County, Georgia
1820s in Georgia (U.S. state)